Events in the year 2017 in Liberia.

Incumbents
 President: Ellen Johnson Sirleaf
 Vice President: Joseph Boakai
 Chief Justice: Francis S. Korkpor, Sr.

Events
22 September – Liberia establishes diplomatic relations with Armenia.
10 October – scheduled date for the Liberian general election, 2017

Deaths

8 January – Ruth Perry, politician (b. 1939).

21 February – Salome Karwah, nurse (born c.1988)

References

 
2010s in Liberia
Years of the 21st century in Liberia
Liberia
Liberia